The Queen Formation is a geologic formation in southeastern New Mexico and west Texas. It preserves fossils dating back to the late Guadalupian Epoch of the Permian period.

Description
It rests on the San Andres Formation, from which it is separated by an erosional surface showing karst features. The Queen Formation is overlain by the Seven Rivers Formation. The Queen Formation is part of the Artesia Group, which is interpreted as a sequence of shelf rocks of the Capitan reef.

History of investigation
The unit was first named as the Queen sandstone of the upper San Andres Formation by Grant Blanchard and Morgan Davis in 1929. In 1937, W.B. Lang assigned the Seven Rivers Member to the (now abandoned) Chalk Bluff Formation. The unit was promoted to formation rank and assigned to the Whitehorse Group by Ronald DeFord and Russell Lloyd in 1940. The formation was assigned to the Artesia Group by D.B. Tait and coinvestigators in 1962.

See also

 List of fossiliferous stratigraphic units in New Mexico
 Paleontology in New Mexico
"

Footnotes

References
 
 
 
 
 
 

Permian formations of New Mexico